Secretary is a title often used in organizations to indicate a person having a certain amount of authority, power, or importance in the organization. Secretaries announce important events and communicate to the organization. The term is derived from the Latin word , "to distinguish" or "to set apart", the passive participle meaning "having been set apart", with the eventual connotation of something private or confidential, as with the English word secret. A  was a person, therefore, overseeing business confidentially, usually for a powerful individual (a king, pope, etc.).

The official title of the leader of most communist and socialist political parties is the "General Secretary of the Central Committee" or "First Secretary of the Central Committee". When a communist party is in power, the general secretary is usually the country's de facto leader (though sometimes this leader also holds state-level positions to monopolize power, such as a presidency or premiership in order to constitute de jure leadership of the state), such as China, North Korea, Vietnam, Laos and Cuba.

In England, the term secretarius was used "from the beginning of the thirteenth century in the varying meanings of a confidential clerk, an ambassador, or a member of the king's council". In the fourteenth century, the title became strongly associated with the keeper of the king's signet. From the Renaissance to the late 19th century, men involved in the daily correspondence and the activities of the powerful assumed the title of secretary. With time, like many titles, the term was applied to more and varied functions, leading to compound titles to specify the authority associated with its use, like general secretary or financial secretary.

In some countries, such as the United States, the term secretary is used to indicate the holder of a cabinet-level post. There are a number of popular variations of the title used to indicate that the secretary in question has a high degree of authority, such as general secretary (or, following usage in the Norman language, secretary-general), first secretary, and executive secretary.

In a club or society, the secretary is also considered to be, in most cases, the third person in charge of the organization, after the president/chairman and vice president/vice chairman.  In smaller organizations, the secretary typically takes meeting minutes, notifies members of meetings, contacts various persons in relation to the society, administers the day-to-day activities of the organization, and creates the order of business. The secretary of a non-governmental organization or international non-governmental organization can combine the function with that of vice president/vice chairman.

General secretary

General secretary occurs as the title of a ministerial position of authority found in various organizations, such as trade unions, communist and socialist parties, and international non-governmental organizations. Examples include:

General Secretary of the Trades Union Congress
General Secretary of the New South Wales Labor Party (Australia)
 Some church organizations, such as the National Council of Churches and the World Council of Churches
General Secretary of the Labour Party

Communist Party

General secretary or first secretary is the official title of leaders of most Communist political parties. When a Communist party is the ruling party in a Communist-led one-party state, the general secretary is typically the country's de facto leader. Examples include:

General Secretary of the Chinese Communist Party
General Secretary of the Communist Party of Vietnam
General Secretary of the Communist Party of Cuba
General Secretary of the Lao People's Revolutionary Party
General Secretary of the Communist Party of the Soviet Union
General Secretary of the Communist Party of Kampuchea
General Secretary of the Mongolian People's Party
General Secretary of the Workers' Party of Korea
General Secretary of the League of Communist of Yugoslavia
General Secretary of the Socialist Unity Party of East Germany
General Secretary of the Communist Party of Czechoslovakia
General Secretary of the Party of Labour of Albania
General Secretary of the Romanian Communist Party
General Secretary of the Hungarian Socialist Workers' Party
General Secretary of the Polish United Workers' Party
General Secretary of the Bulgarian Communist Party

Secretary-general
Examples include:

International intergovernmental organizations

International nongovernmental organizations

Sports governing bodies

First secretary

First secretary is the title of the chief officer or leader in many organizations, and is also a modern diplomatic rank. Examples include:
 Some consumer organizations, such as the National Consumers League
 Some political parties, especially Communist or Socialist Parties

 In Workers' Party and Communist Party organizations:
 First Secretary of the Communist Party of Armenia
 First Secretary of the Communist Party of Azerbaijan
 First Secretary of the Chinese Communist Party—see Party Secretariat
 First Secretary of the Chinese Communist Party—see Party Committee Secretary
 First Secretary of the Communist Youth League of China
 First Secretary of the Communist Party of Cuba
 First Secretary of the Communist Party of Czechoslovakia
 First Secretary of the French Socialist Party
 First Secretary of the Georgian Communist Party
 First Secretary of the Communist Party of Lithuania
 First Secretary of the Polish United Workers' Party
 First Secretary of the Communist Party of the Russian Federation
 First Secretary of the Communist Party of the Soviet Union
 First Secretary of the Moscow Communist Party
 First Secretary of the Communist Party of Tajikistan
 First Secretary of the Ukrainian Communist Party
 First Secretary of the Workers' Party of Vietnam
 First Secretary of State, a cabinet position in the United Kingdom
 First Secretary for Wales, now First Minister of Wales
 First Secretary of the Admiralty—see Secretary to the Admiralty
 Some trade unions, especially in the United Kingdom
 The General Secretariat for Macedonia and Thrace, a government agency for the Greek regions of Macedonia and Thrace

Executive secretary
Examples include:

 Executive Secretary (Commonwealth of Independent States)
 Executive Secretary (Philippines)
 Executive Secretary for Integral Development, Organization of American States
 Executive Secretary of the Department of State, United States

Secretary-treasurer
Within many organizations, the title of secretary is combined with that of treasurer.

See also
Undersecretary
Secretary
Legal secretary
Cabinet secretary or Department secretary

References

 
Chief executive officers
Clubs and societies
Government occupations
Management occupations
Positions of authority
Titles